As aventuras de Sérgio Mallandro (The Adventures of Sergio Mallandro) is a Brazilian movie directed by Erasto Filho, released in 1985.

Sinopse
The extraterrestrial dwarf Superpoderoso (super powerful) comes to Earth to find a human to enfranchise him with the power of "doing good".  Mallandro is the chosen one, but he will need to prove himself worth by accomplishing a mission:  to find a little monkey lost by a girl called Tininha.  If Mallandro fail, the power of "doing good" will be given to the movie's super villain, Dom Pedro de Lara y Lara, played by Pedro de Lara.

Cast
Sérgio Mallandro
Pedro de Lara .... Dom Pedro
Palhaço Rolinha .... Superpoderoso
Cosme dos Santos .... Zé Cocada
Alexandre Frota
Carla Prestes .... Tininha
Mara Maravilha
Fernando Reski
Paulo Cintura
Sylvinho

1985 films
Brazilian comedy films